Antennatus dorehensis, commonly known as the New Guinean frogfish, is a species of fish in the family Antennariidae. It is found throughout the Indo-Pacific including East Africa, the Philippines, New Guinea, the Aldabra Islands, the Ryukyu Islands, the Cocos Islands, and Tahiti. This species occurs in intertidal reef flats and reaches 14 cm (5.5 inches) in total length. It is an oviparous fish that binds its eggs in thin ribbons or large masses of gelatinous mucus known as egg "rafts" or "veils".

References 

Antennariidae
Taxa named by Pieter Bleeker
Fish described in 1859